Rohan Joshi is a YouTuber. He was one of the key people of the creative agency All India Bakchod. Joshi scripted and starred in several YouTube sketches for All India Bakchod, was one of the co-creators of the satirical news comedy show On Air with AIB. Now he runs his own youtube channel and make reaction videos with Tanmay Bhat and Nishant Tanwar.

Early life and education
Joshi attended K J Somaiya College of Engineering, but eventually dropped out. He attended Jai Hind College and subsequently worked as a journalist for a period of time. Before working for CNBC and Times Now, Joshi also attended Asian College of Journalism, Chennai, where he received his postgraduate diploma in broadcast journalism.

Career
In the late 2000s, Joshi was a contributor to JLT, a humour magazine based in Mumbai. In addition to performing across India, Joshi served as a humour columnist for several publications including Mid-Day. In 2011, he performed at the Edinburgh Fringe Festival. In 2011 and 2012, he co-wrote the Filmfare awards. In addition, he has performed in over 250 shows. Joshi spent a couple of years at Vir Das's comedy platform Weirdass, writing live comedy shows with Tanmay Bhat and Ashish Shakya. With Gursimran Khamba, they co-wrote television scripts and jokes for MTV, Channel V, and the Filmfare Awards. In 2013, the four started the SoundCloud podcast All India Bakchod (AIB). Joshi scripted and starred in several YouTube sketches for All India Bakchod, and was a co-creator of the satirical news comedy show On Air with AIB. Following controversy and sexual misconduct allegations against AIB members, the comedy company ceased operating in 2018.

In April 2019, Joshi confirmed that he was working on an hour-long stand-up comedy special for Amazon Prime Video. On 10 January 2020, Joshi's special Wake And Bake was released on Amazon Prime Video.

Controversies 
Joshi's tweet over comedian Raju Srivastav's death caused widespread outrage on Twitter. He later deleted his tweet.

Filmography

References

External links 

1983 births
Living people
Indian stand-up comedians